Agostino Luigi Spina (born 31 October 2001) is an Argentine professional footballer who plays as a midfielder for Unión Magdalena.

Career
Spina began his career with Huracán. He trained with Israel Damonte's first-team squad at various points across 2020, notably featuring in a friendly match with Arsenal de Sarandí in October. Spina made his debut at the age of nineteen on 14 February 2021 against Defensa y Justicia in the Copa de la Liga Profesional, with the central midfielder scoring his first goal in the process at the Estadio Norberto "Tito" Tomaghello.

At the end of June 2022, Spina joined Colombian Categoría Primera A side Unión Magdalena.

Career statistics
.

Notes

References

External links

2001 births
Living people
Argentine footballers
Argentine expatriate footballers
Place of birth missing (living people)
Association football midfielders
Argentine Primera División players
Categoría Primera A players
Club Atlético Huracán footballers
Unión Magdalena footballers
Argentine expatriate sportspeople in Colombia
Expatriate footballers in Colombia